Abbots Oak is a hamlet near Coalville, Leicestershire, comprising a cluster of dwellings near Warren Hills, either side of the road between Whitwick and Copt Oak.

There is a public house here called The Bull's Head, which claims the distinction of being the highest public house in Leicestershire, at seven hundred and eighty seven feet above sea level.

The hamlet also contains the Abbots Oak Country House, which is a Grade II listed building. The house is built of Charnwood granite and has an imposing tower with a fine wooden staircase; its listing description ascribes a mid-nineteenth century origin.

References

Hamlets in Leicestershire
North West Leicestershire District